Ashland Creek is a  tributary of Bear Creek in the U.S. state of Oregon. It joins Bear Creek near Ashland,  from the larger stream's confluence with the Rogue River.

The main stem of Ashland Creek begins at Reeder Reservoir, an artificial impoundment of about  that provides municipal water to the city of Ashland. Two tributaries (forks) of the main stem feed the reservoir. The forks flow generally north through the Rogue River – Siskiyou National Forest to the reservoir.

Below the reservoir, the main stem continues north through a canyon, then through a channel confined by urban development and into the broad alluvial valley of Bear Creek. The stream gradient averages about 9 percent on the upper reaches and 3 percent within the city.

Watershed
In 2001, this included (rounded to the nearest hundred)  of forests;  of city development;  of rural development;  of farms, and smaller allotments for other uses. About  of roads crisscrossed the watershed.

Floods
Erosion along the tributaries and upper reaches coupled with rain-on-snow events contribute to sediment transport and floods along Ashland Creek. About  of sediment per year accumulates in Reeder Reservoir, but a flood in 1974 deposited  quickly, forcing the city to temporarily shut down the municipal water supply. In addition to moving sediment, heavy flows block the creek with woody debris, creating dams that, upon breaking, cause flood surges. Five significant floods, the last in 1997, damaged property in Ashland during the second half of the 20th century. The 1997 rain-on-snow event caused many streams in the Bear Creek watershed to reach 100-year flood levels, resulting in $4.5 million in damages.

See also
 List of rivers of Oregon

References

External links
 Bear Creek Watershed Council
 Photos of the 1997 flood
 Television video clip of the 1997 flood

Rivers of Jackson County, Oregon
Rivers of Oregon